"I Feel Something in the Air" is a song written and produced by Sonny Bono that was released as the second single from Cher's third album Chér in 1966.

"I Feel Something in the Air" became a minor hit by peaking at number 43 on the UK Singles Chart. However, it failed to reach the U.S. charts. The song was also known, and released as "Magic in the Air" in some places.

Cher also recorded the song in Italian, as "Nel Mio Cielo Ci Sei Tu".

Charts

References

1966 singles
Cher songs
Songs written by Sonny Bono
Imperial Records singles
1966 songs
Liberty Records singles
Articles containing video clips